Carl Clarke Martin (born 24 October 1986) is an English semi-professional footballer who plays as a defender. He last played in 2015 for Wealdstone.

Career
Martin was born in Camden, London. He started his career in non-league football with Wealdstone before signing for Football League Two side Crewe Alexandra in October 2009. He made his league debut for Crewe on 19 January 2010 in the 1–1 draw with Hereford United at Edgar Street. On 9 March 2010, Martin was sent off in a league game against Grimsby Town, which led to his manager Dario Gradi slating him to the media, not for the sending off but for not following his manager's instructions by running with the ball. Gradi went on to state that Martin would not feature again until he could trust him to follow instructions, also stating: "whatever ban he gets will be music to my ears."

On 1 June 2012 Martin was released by Crewe Alexandra, joining Macclesfield Town, where he remained until 2014. On 30 June 2014, he returned to Wealdstone.

Honours
Crewe Alexandra
'Football League Two play-off Final winner: 2012

References

External links

1986 births
Living people
Footballers from Camden Town
English footballers
Association football defenders
Wealdstone F.C. players
Crewe Alexandra F.C. players
Macclesfield Town F.C. players
English Football League players
National League (English football) players
Southampton F.C. non-playing staff